Walter "Wat" Dumaux Edmonds (July 15, 1903 – January 24, 1998) was an American writer best known for historical novels. One of them, Drums Along the Mohawk (1936), was adapted as a Technicolor feature film in 1939, directed by John Ford and starring Henry Fonda and Claudette Colbert.

Life

Edmonds was born in Boonville, New York. In 1919 he entered The Choate School (now Choate Rosemary Hall) in Wallingford, Connecticut. Originally intending to study chemical engineering, he became more interested in writing and worked as managing editor of the Choate Literary Magazine. He graduated in 1926 from Harvard, where he edited The Harvard Advocate, and where he studied with Charles Townsend Copeland.  He married Eleanor Stetson in 1930.

In 1929, he published his first novel, Rome Haul, a work about the Erie Canal. The novel was adapted for the 1934 play The Farmer Takes a Wife and the 1935 film of the same name.

Drums Along the Mohawk was on the bestseller list for two years, second only to Margaret Mitchell's famous 1936 novel Gone with the Wind for part of that time. 

Edmonds eventually published 34 books, many for children, as well as a number of magazine stories. He won the Lewis Carroll Shelf Award in 1960 and the Newbery Medal in 1942, for The Matchlock Gun, and the National Book Award for Young People's Literature in 1976, for Bert Breen's Barn.

When Eleanor died in 1956, Walter married Katherine Howe Baker Carr, who died in 1989. Walter Edmonds died in Concord, Massachusetts, in 1998.

Work

Novels
Rome Haul (1929) *
The Big Barn (1930)
Erie Water (1933)
Drums Along the Mohawk (1936) *
Chad Hanna (1940) *
Young Ames (1942) *
The Wedding Journey (1947)
The Boyds of Black River (1953)
 Wolf Hunt (1970)

Juvenile Novels
The Matchlock Gun (1941)
Tom Whipple (1942)
Two Logs Crossing: John Haskell's Story (1943)
Cadmus Henry (1949)
Time to Go House (1969)
Bert Breen's Barn (1975)

Autobiographical Novel
The South African Quirt (1985)

Short Story Collections
Mostly Canallers (1934) *
In the Hands of the Senecas (1947)
Seven American Stories (1970)
The Night Raider and Other Stories (1980)

Non-Fiction
They Fought with What They Had: The Story of the Army Air Forces in the Southwest Pacific, 1941-1942 (1951)
The Musket and the Cross: The Struggle of France and England for North America (1968)
Tales My Father Never Told (1995)

* Novels Rome Haul, Drums Along the Mohawk, Chad Hanna, Young Ames and the short story collection Mostly Canallers were published as Armed Services Editions during WWII.

See also

References

Further reading

External links 
 Choate Rosemary Hall obituary 
 Remembrance from UticaOD.com
 Edmonds papers at Harvard
 
 

1903 births
1998 deaths
American children's writers
American historical novelists
20th-century American novelists
Newbery Medal winners
National Book Award for Young People's Literature winners
Novelists from New York (state)
Novelists from Massachusetts
Choate Rosemary Hall alumni
People from Boonville, New York
American male novelists
Harvard Advocate alumni
20th-century American male writers